Robin Urban (born 13 April 1994) is a German footballer who plays as a centre-back for SSVg Velbert.

References

External links
 
 

1994 births
People from Herdecke
Sportspeople from Arnsberg (region)
Footballers from North Rhine-Westphalia
Living people
German footballers
Association football defenders
Fortuna Düsseldorf II players
Fortuna Düsseldorf players
Hallescher FC players
SSV Jahn Regensburg players
SSV Jahn Regensburg II players
Rot-Weiss Essen players
VfB Homberg players
KSV Hessen Kassel players
SSVg Velbert players
2. Bundesliga players
3. Liga players
Regionalliga players
Oberliga (football) players